Awrabunia Union (Bengali:আওরাবুনিয়া ইউনিয়ন) is one of the six union councils under Kathalia Upazila of Jhalakati District in the Barishal Division of southern region of Bangladesh.

Geography 
Awrabunia Union is situated near the Kathalia Sadar of Kathalia Upazila.

Area 
Awrabunia has an area of 5,032 acres.

Geographical Data

Canal and River

Cultural Features

Language

Festival

Sports

Administration

Administrative Structure 
Awrabunia Union is the 6th Union Parishad Under Kathalia Upazila.The administrative activities of this union is under Kathalia Union Parishad. This is included in the 125 No. Electoral Area Jhalakathi-1 of National Parliament .

Administrative Areas 
At Present, there is 9 villages under Awrabunia Union.The administrative activities of this union is under Awrabunia Union Parishad.

Demographics 
According to Census-2011, The total population of Awrabunia Union is 16,901.Among them number of male is 8,227 and number of female is 8,674.Number of total family is 3,923.

Village-wise Population

Education 
According to the Census-2011, the literacy rate of Awrabunia Union is about 95%.

Number of Educational Institution

Health

Agriculture

Economics

Transportation

Roadway

Waterway

Media

Places of interest

Awrabunia Jomadder Bari Masjid 
Awrabunia Jomadder Bari Masjid is a hundreds year aged Mosque built in Mughal period. Thousands of Muslim says there prayer here till now.

Notable personalities

Markets

See also 

 Upazilas of Bangladesh
 Districts of Bangladesh
 Divisions of Bangladesh

References

External links 

Unions of Kathalia Upazila
Jhalokati District